Park and Tilford Building is a historic commercial building located at 310 Lenox Avenue in Harlem, Manhattan, New York City.

Description and history 
It was built in 1908 and is a three-story, unreinforced masonry building with a full basement in the Classical Revival style. It features exterior decoration in white marble, limestone, and terra cotta. It originally housed a Park & Tilford grocery store on the first floor, with offices above. As of 2009, the National Basketball Players Association occupied the building's third floor.

It was listed on the National Register of Historic Places on May 1, 2009.

References

1908 establishments in New York City
Commercial buildings completed in 1908
Commercial buildings on the National Register of Historic Places in Manhattan
Harlem
Neoclassical architecture in New York (state)